SV Limburgia, a Dutch football/sports club from the city of Brunssum, Netherlands.
 1383 Limburgia, a minor planet+